Adyla Rafa Naura Ayu (born June 18, 2005) is an Indonesian actress and singer. Following her mother's career, Riafinola Ifani Sari, Naura became a child singer in 2014 with the release of her first studio album  which won the award for Best Children's Album in the Anugerah Musik Indonesia 2015. Naura is the first Indonesian child singer to win the Triple Platinum award thanks to her fourth album,  which has sold 500 thousand CDs.

To date, Naura is the only child singer who has won the most awards for Best Child Solo Artist from the Anugerah Musik Indonesia, three times in 2016, 2018, and 2019.

In early 2021, Naura released the single "Kisah Kasih Sayang" which is her first single as a teenage singer.

Early life 
Naura was born in Jakarta, Indonesia. She is the eldest of four children. Her father, Baldy Mulya Putra is a businessman and her mother, Riafinola Ifani Sari is a singer. Naura is of Palembang and Batak descent through her father; also Javanese and Minangkabau through her mother. Naura has 3 younger siblings, namely Adyano Rafi Bevan Putra, Anodya Shula Neona Ayu—who also works as a singer and Aladya Odetta Nakeya Ayu.

Naura got singing talent from her mother. She has shown interest in music since she was 3 years old, at which time Naura prefers to watch musical cartoon videos than other cartoon videos. However, her mother, Nola, did not want to take Naura's interest seriously because Nola consider children of Naura's age usually get tired and bored easily.

When she was 5 years old, Naura had asked to sing but was not allowed by her mother because she thought she was too young. But the desire remained until two years later. For two years, Naura studied singing at home and studied the genre of music she liked. Naura admits that she likes classical musicals, such as Sound of Music, and songs from older singers, such as Frank Sinatra, Queen and Michael Jackson. In addition, she also listens to modern singers, such as Beyonce and Ariana Grande, as well as Ardhito Pramono, Raisa and her teammate Lala Karmela from Indonesia. Naura was only allowed to become a singer when she was 7 years old because her mother wanted to ensure that Naura was determined and consistently pursued her singing talent.

Career

2014–2015: Dongeng and Konser Dongeng Musikal 
Following her mother's career in the music industry, Naura started her career as a child singer at the age of 8 by releasing her first studio album entitled Dongeng through the Catz Records record company. The Dongeng album launched on June 2, 2014, at Galeri Indonesia Kaya, Grand Indonesia, Jakarta Pusat. At that time, Naura was present in the midst of the absence of children's music where the Indonesian music industry was battered with love songs.

Dongeng succeeded in bringing Naura to her first award in the music industry as the Best Children's Album from the Anugerah Musik Indonesia 2015.

In 2015, Naura held a musical themed concert titled Konser Dongeng which was inspired by his debut album, Dongeng with the theme of the story being carried out is about himself, life, ideas, nature, thoughts, environment, school, family and her dream.

2016: Langit yang Sama 
After joining the Trinity Optima Production record company, on March 9, 2016, he released his second studio album, entitled Langit yang Sama. Album ini bertemakan keseharian yang bermuatan edukasi dengan sarat pesan moral pada setiap lagunya. This album is themed daily with educational content with moral messages in each song. In the process, all the songs were composed by Mhala & Tantra Numata with the concept of arrangement for all the songs on the album Langit yang Sama done in an orchestra with a musical approach so that it is easy for children to digest.

Langit yang Sama managed to bring Naura to win the Best Children's Album award from Anugerah Musik Indonesia 2016 for the second time and won the Best Solo Female Child Singer award in the same event through the Untuk Tuhan song which is the first single from the Langit yang Sama album.

2017: Naura & Genk Juara 

In 2017, Naura made his acting debut by starring in the Naura & Genk Juara musical film.  In this film, Naura was given the opportunity to play the main role as Naura herself, leader of Juara gang.

In the previous year, she also voiced in the animated film Petualangan Singa Pemberani Atlantos 2 voiced the character Bella, the daughter of the mayor of Seal Island. Naura & Genk Juara is not the first time for Naura to act, previously she was involved in a folklore musical theater entitled Timun Mas The Musical which was held in June 2013 as young Mawar.

Apart from being the main character, she also sang the album's theme song for the film. Ost. Naura & Genk Juara album consists of 9 songs all performed by Naura and composed by Mhala and Tantra Numata.

Through Naura & Genk Juara succeeded in bringing Naura to be nominated as the Chosen Actor/Child Actress/Teenager in the Piala Maya 2017. In addition, she also won an award as the Best Male and Female Solo Artist at the Anugerah Musik Indonesia 2018 through the song Berani Bermimpi which is the last track from Ost. Naura & Genk Juara.

2018–2019: Katakanlah Cinta and  Konser Dongeng 4 
In 2018, Naura released her fourth album entitled Katakanlah Cinta. The album consists of 11 songs of which there are 4 previously released singles, 2 songs from the Dongeng album and 3 songs from Ost. Naura & Genk Juara. Different from the previous 3 albums which were specifically for children and packaged musically, Katakanlah Cinta is themed about love that is universal and packed with pop nuances. Like the previous album, this album is again done by Shimhala Avadana & Tantra Numata as songwriters.

In June 2019, Katakanlah Cinta managed to achieve sales of over 500 thousand CDs through marketing at a fast food restaurant, KFC. This made Naura the first child singer to receive the "Triple Platinum" award.

In February 2019, Naura was selected to be one of 16 Indonesian participants who received a scholarship from Galeri Indonesia Kaya to take part in the performing arts training Broadway in United States in the program Ruang Kreatif: Indonesia Menuju Broadway. This program is organized by Bakti Budaya Djarum Foundation in collaboration with Passport to Broadway, New York. Naura has participated in the program since July 2019 and lasts for 3 weeks.

On December 21, 2019, together with Galeri Indonesia Kaya, Naura held the Konser Dongeng 4. Konser Dongeng 4 was the closing of the Konser Dongeng series that had been going on since 2015 as well as Naura's last concert as a child singer and a sign that Naura entered a new phase as a teenage singer at the age of 14.

2020–present: As teenage singer 
Approaching his teenage years, Naura actively discussed mental health issues and also self-love, one of which was by creating a single entitled "Di Kelilingi Cinta".

On October 11, 2020, Naura launched her podcast entitled Naw You Tell Me which was broadcast on her official YouTube channel. This podcast was initiated by Naura's desire to share experiences about life, mental health, self-love, and other issues regarding youth.

Through her interview with Indonesian media, Popbela in 2021, Naura said that the single "Kisah Kasih Sayang" which was released on March 19, 2021 was her first single as a teenage singer. In her career as a teenage singer, Naura admits that her musical style has become more minimalist, with more mature arrangements and has wider song inspiration.

Discography 
Studio Album
 Dongeng (2014)
 Langit yang Sama (2016)
 Katakanlah Cinta (2018)

Soundtrack Album
 Ost. Naura & Genk Juara (2017)

Single
 Untuk Tuhan (2015)
 Bully (2016)
 Katakanlah Cinta (2018)
 Sang Juara  – 2018 Asian Para Games (Official Song) (2018) 
 Selamanya Untukmu (#TemanNaura) (2018)
 Karena Kamu Artinya Cinta (Sentuhan Ibu)  (2018)
 Aku Indonesia (2018)
 Harmoni  (2019)
 Dikelilingi Cinta (2020)
 Kisah Kasih Sayang (2021)
 Jalan Tengah (2021)
 Menikmati Sedih (2022)

As featured artist
 Tak Harus Menggenggam (2019)

Filmography

Film

Television series

Web series

Music Video

Musical Drama

Television

Bibliography 

 2017 — Aku Naura: 100% Official
 2018 — Aku Naura: The Official Scrapbook
 2020 — Konser Dongeng Naura

Awards and nominations

References

External links 
 
 
   Naura Ayu profile on Trinity Optima Production

2005 births
People from Palembang
Mandailing people
Minangkabau people
Javanese people
Living people
Indonesian child singers
21st-century Indonesian women singers
Indonesian pop singers
Anugerah Musik Indonesia winners
People from Jakarta
Actresses from Jakarta
Musicians from Jakarta
Indonesian child actresses